The 1976 Virginia Slims of San Francisco, was a women's tennis tournament that took place on indoor carpet courts at the Civic Auditorium in San Francisco in the United States. It was the sixth edition of the event, which was part of the Virginia Slims Circuit, and was held from March 1 through March 6, 1976. The final was watched by 4,800 spectators who saw second-seeded Chris Evert win the singles title, earning $15,000 first-prize money.

Finals

Singles
 Chris Evert defeated  Evonne Goolagong Cawley 7–5, 7–6(5–2)
 It was Evert's 5th singles title of the year and the 60th of her career.

Doubles
 Billie Jean King /  Betty Stöve defeated  Rosemary Casals /  Françoise Dürr 6–4, 6–1

Prize money

References

VS of San Francisco
VS of San Francisco
Silicon Valley Classic
Virginia Slims of San Francisco
Virginia Slims of San Francisco